H. montanus  may refer to:
Hemicrepidius montanus, beetle
Henricus montanus, moth
Hisonotus montanus, catfish
Hyaenodon montanus, extinct mammal
Hyperolius montanus, frog endemic to Kenya

See also
 Montanus (disambiguation)